Brinkhuis is a surname. Notable people with the surname include: 

 Galil Brinkhuis, South African politician
 Jan Brinkhuis (born 1952), Dutch mathematician
 Nienke Brinkhuis (born 1971), Dutch actress who appeared in Swingers (2002 film)